OGame is a browser-based, money-management and space-war themed massively multiplayer online browser game with over two million accounts. OGame was created in 2002 and is produced and maintained by Gameforge. OGame is available in multiple languages, and different nationalities have their own communities. The game does not differ between the nationality communities except in rare cases. Players are generally informed of news, rule changes, or new versions through the official forums.

As of January 19, 2011, OGame.org has a total of 52 universes, including ten universes using the new redesign. More are being added periodically. The Ogame prOgame universe (Universe 35) has been discontinued as an exclusive for paying members, so anyone may now sign up for it.

Gameplay
All OGame universes consist of three classifications: galaxies, systems, and planet slots (which break down to planets, moons, and debris fields). All universes have up to 9 galaxies, each with 499 (1-499) systems, which have 15 planet slots.

Each player starts with one planet at randomly assigned coordinates in slots 4,6,8,10,12, in a random system and galaxy. The first planet always consists of 163 fields, which determine how many building upgrades can be built on the planet, regardless of the slot in the player's system.  Originally, the player's empire could consist of up to 9 planets in any unoccupied planet slot. However, with the redesign, that cap was lifted, albeit with the requirement that each planet required two additional levels of research, with a progressive cost. All construction, research, and missions are performed and launched from a planet or moon. Development is done through using five resources: metal, crystal, deuterium, energy, and dark matter. There are different ways to obtain these resources, including mining, trading, and raiding (see Combat below). Players are ranked according to their points, with one point awarded for every thousand resource units invested in construction, research, ships, or defense. No points are given for unspent resources.

Combat
Unlike many other real-time strategy games, OGame does not give the player constant control of their spacecraft. Instead, the player sends the ship(s) to a location (using the game's coordinate system) and what happens when the fleet arrives is beyond the player's control; in OGame, combat is resolved when fleets and/or defenses meet. The combat takes place instantly and consists of 1 to 6 rounds. Fleet attacks are usually aimed to obtain other player's planetary resources, which is called raiding, although players may also initiate fleet attacks to destroy an opponent's fleet and collect resources from the debris field created from the battle. Debris fields only contain Metal and Crystal, increasing the probability of a raid from those in search of Deuterium. Defenses are built to defend a planet against an attacking enemy fleet. If destroyed, 70 percent of defensive structures will be recovered after the battle. Destroyed ships are not recovered.

Alliances
An alliance is a group of players who have banded together and is mostly used for solidarity purposes. Alliances are created for players to protect each other from attacks, join together to raid other planets, or to promote free trade among members.  Members of an alliance can use the  Alliance Combat System, available in some universes, to synchronize fleet movements and missions with members of the same alliance and temporarily deploy a fleet on an ally's planet. Alliances can utilize certain forums on the boards to instigate wars or truces between each other, as well as create their own alliance page in the game itself.

Merchants
Players can hire a merchant using dark matter to trade one resource type for another. The amount of resources traded is limited to the amount of free space in one's storage buildings and the amount of dark matter the player has.

Officers
OGame offers four different Officers and a Commander, each costs a set amount of Dark Matter, obtained with in-game exploration or by paying money, to 'hire' for either 1 week or 3 months. The names of the four different officers are the Engineer, the Geologist, the Technocrat and the Fleet Admiral. Each one improves certain elements of chance or resource production.

The Commander officer gives the user extra benefits such as an ad-free interface, a building queue, an improved galaxy view with added information, a message filter, extra shortcuts to enhance play and an 'Empire' view.  Empire view gives the player an interface which shows information about all planets, including mine and power plant levels and ships currently docked.  Upgrades to buildings can be performed via the Empire view.

Resources
There are three main resources: Metal, Crystal and Deuterium.

The three main resources (Metal, Crystal, Deuterium) can be created via mines or money. There are separate mines for each resource which can be upgraded to produce the resources faster. These resources are used for making buildings, ships, defenses and for researching technology. To run the mines, energy is needed. Energy is produced by creating the following: solar plant, solar satellites (available via shipyard), and fusion reactor (converts a specified amount of deuterium into energy). These buildings can also be upgraded to produce more energy.

Dark Matter, however, cannot be created (Only can be purchased with money payments). Fleets can be sent out on expeditions to search for it. It can also be bought with real money. Dark Matter is used to "call a trader" who trades the main three resources, to buy an officer, or move an existing planet.

Deuterium is the most particularly valuable resource because it seconds as fuel for ships. The bigger the fleet of ships, the more fuel is required to travel certain distances. Players with large fleets will find themselves selling their Metal and Crystal to buy Deuterium, as Deuterium mines are very expensive to upgrade along with maintaining a large fleet.

Expeditions
Expeditions are fleets that go outside the system but not to another. Astrophysics is needed for expeditions. Expeditions can find resources and the valuable Dark Matter.

Moons
Moons are created when a debris field is large enough to form together. The largest debris fields will yield a maximum 20 percent chance of creating a Moon, and they will also create the Moons with the most available space. Players in an alliance will often give each other "moonshots" by attacking a certain number of ships purposefully left behind.

Once a planet has a Moon orbiting it, many more options are opened up for movement and tracking other ships. A Jump Gate can be built which allows players to send ships instantly from Jump Gate to Jump Gate. After a Jump Gate is used, there is an hour-long cooling period before it can be used again. A Sensor Phalanx also can be built, which tracks enemy ship movements in its range.

Building and upgrading on Moons uses fields just like planets, but Moons have far fewer fields to work with.

References

External links

 Official English OGame website
Gameforge

2002 video games
Video games developed in Germany
Browser games
Massively multiplayer online real-time strategy games
Space massively multiplayer online role-playing games
Browser-based multiplayer online games
Online text-based role-playing games
Gameforge games